Cyber World is a science fiction/cyberpunk anthology edited by Hugo Award-winner Jason Heller and Joshua Viola published on November 8, 2016 (Election Day). It is the second anthology from Hex Publishers, preceded by Nightmares Unhinged, and aims to re-brand the cyberpunk genre.

About
Cyber World: Tales of Humanity's Tomorrow is a science fiction anthology edited by Jason Heller and Josh Viola with twenty short stories by award-winning and bestselling authors, including Saladin Ahmed, Nisi Shawl, E. Lily Yu, Cat Rambo, Matthew Kressel, Paolo Bacigalupi, Minister Faust, Stephen Graham Jones, Alyssa Wong, Keith Ferrell, and many others. Richard Kadrey wrote the book's foreword and Chuck Wendig and Warren Ellis provided blurbs, praising the collection. The book received a starred review from Publishers Weekly, who said the book expands the "already-fluid definition of cyberpunk".
 The book also features a companion soundtrack primarily composed of music by Klayton, who records as Celldweller, Circle of Dust, and Scandroid. There are also two tracks by Mega Drive.

Release details
 2016, United States, Hex Publishers , Pub date November 8, 2016, Trade paperback

References

2016 anthologies
Science fiction anthologies
2010s science fiction works